XHENO-FM is a radio station in Toluca, State of Mexico. Broadcasting on 90.1 FM, XHENO is owned by Grupo ACIR and carries its Mix adult contemporary format.

History
XHENO received its concession on November 23, 1994. It was intended to be located in Tenango de Arista and owned by José Ignacio Pichardo Lechuga. XHENO was sold to ACIR in 1998.

References

Radio stations in the State of Mexico
Grupo ACIR